Hayat ech Chaab ('The Life of the People') was an Arabic language weekly newspaper issued by the Moroccan Communist Party (PCM) 1945–1956. Hayat ech Chaab was published by Ali Yata. The first issue was published in May 1945. Hayat ech Chaab was published clandestinely (the Communist Party was banned at the time), and printed on roneograph.

References

1945 establishments in Morocco
1956 disestablishments in Morocco
Arabic communist newspapers
Arabic-language newspapers
Defunct newspapers published in Morocco
Defunct weekly newspapers
Newspapers published in Morocco
Newspapers established in 1945
Publications disestablished in 1956